MS 18 may refer to:
Mara 18, a Central American gang
Mississippi Highway 18
Soyuz MS-18